"We Need a Whole Lot More of Jesus (and a Lot Less Rock and Roll)" is a Christian country song originally written and recorded by Wayne Raney in 1959. It later attracted renewed interest during the American folk music revival. Though it was originally intended to be sincere, the song has since been covered ironically by Linda Ronstadt and the Greenbriar Boys, among other artists. Author Peter Lewry described Ronstadt's cover as "...one of the standout tracks" on Hand Sown ... Home Grown, the album on which the cover originally appeared.

References

1959 songs
Songs about Jesus
American country music songs
Songs written by Wayne Raney